Stiff Valentine is a Canadian heavy metal band from Vancouver, British Columbia. Their synthesis of genre has been called "Industrial-EBM-Hard-Rock-Synth-Pop-Punk".

Stiff Valentine has shared members with Sounds of Mass Production, 16 Volt, Chemlab, KMFDM, Front Line Assembly, Left Spine Down, and Dismantled.

Members 

Current live members
"Loud" Chris DeMarcus – vocals, guitar
Kerry "Babz" Peterson – vocals, keyboards
Craig "Hollywood" Jensen – guitar and drums
Galen Waling – drums

Known guest members
Jason Bazinet – drums
Eric Powell – vocals
Steve White – guitar
Jared Slingerland – guitar
Adam "Too Much" Johnson – bass
Craig Huxtable – keyboards
Matt Sheppard – keyboards
Kaine Delay – vocals
Darin Wall – bass
Daniel Belasco – guitar and keyboards
Gabriel Shaw – vocals
Alex King – vocals
Jon Sheppard – percussion

Discography

Albums
 Industrial Metal Disco (2009)
 America Bleeding (2011)
 America Inbreeding (2012)
 Empire of Illusion (2013)
 Empire of Death (2014)

EPs
 DigiTrash EP (2006)
 Loveless EP (2008)

Compilations 
 WTII Minifest 2 (2011)
 WTII Records Sampler Spring 2012 (2012)
 Electronic Saviors Volume 2: Recurrence (2012)
 WTII Records 2013 Sampler (2013)
 Electronic Saviors Volume 3: Remission (2015)

Remixes 
 Left Spine Down – Reset (Stiff Valentine Remix) (2009)
 16volt – Become Your None (Smp Vs Stiff Valentine)  (2010)
 am.psych – Disease (Stiff Valentine Remix Feat. DeathProof) (2011)
 Unit·187 – Sick Obsession (Stiff Valentine Remix) (2012)
 Ego Likenss – Treacherous Thing (Stiff Valentine Remix) (2012)
 Microwaved – Gave Up (Stiff Valentine Remix) (2012)
 Vein Collector – Trapped (Deathproofed Mix By Stiff Valentine) (2012)
 Reign Forced – Dichotomy (Deutsche Harte Mix By Stiff Valentine) (2012)
 Aesthetic Perfection – Antibody (Stiff Valentine Mix) (2013)

See also
Front Line Assembly
16volt
Sounds of Mass Production
KMFDM
Left Spine Down
Dismantled
Industrial rock

References

External links
Official website
WTII Records page
J Goth Review of Loveless
Exclaim! Magazine's review of Loveless EP

Canadian industrial music groups
Electronic body music groups
Canadian electronic music groups
Canadian alternative rock groups
Canadian punk rock groups
Musical groups from Vancouver
Musical groups established in 2006
Canadian musical trios
2006 establishments in British Columbia